Lynvale Bloomfield (27 September 1959 – 2 February 2019) was a Jamaican Member of Parliament from the People's National Party who was murdered while in office.

Career 
A doctor by profession, Bloomfield was first elected to the Parliament of Jamaica in the 2011 general election. He was re-elected in 2016.

Murder 
On the morning of 2 February 2019, Bloomfield was found stabbed to death at his home in Paisley Gardens. His funeral took place at the Church of the Open Bible in Port Antonio on 23 February 2019. He was buried at Prospect Cemetery. 21-year-old Simeon Anthony Sutherland of Buff Bay in Portland was detained on 13 February and charged with the murder on 2 March. The trial was postponed to April 2022. A bench warrant was issued in November 2022.

References 

1960 births
2019 deaths
People's National Party (Jamaica) politicians
Members of the House of Representatives of Jamaica
21st-century Jamaican politicians
Jamaican murder victims
Deaths by stabbing in Jamaica

University of Havana alumni
People from Portland Parish
Jamaican Baptists
February 2019 events in North America
2019 murders in North America
Jamaican physicians
Members of the 12th Parliament of Jamaica
Members of the 13th Parliament of Jamaica